Ivan Božić (born 19 November 1983 in Sarajevo) is a Bosnian-Herzegovinian football player who plays for Italian club ACD Trasimeno.

Club career
Božić started his career at Zrinjski Mostar of Premier League of Bosnia and Herzegovina. In summer 2000, he moved to Zuid-West-Vlaanderen of Belgian League. He went to Šibenik in summer 2002, due to the merge of Zuid-West-Vlaanderen and K.S.V. Ingelmunster. Božić back to Belgian League in summer 2006 for Beveren, but the relegation he made his Belgian career with another early end. After 1 season in Rijeka he returned to Šibenik in the Croatian First League.

On 22 July 2014, Božić transferred to China League One side Beijing Baxy.

After three months in Croatia, Božić returned to Italy in December 2019 and signed with ACD Trasimeno.

References

External links
 
 

1983 births
Living people
Footballers from Sarajevo
Association football forwards
Bosnia and Herzegovina footballers
K.R.C. Zuid-West-Vlaanderen players
HNK Šibenik players
K.S.K. Beveren players
HNK Rijeka players
NK Hrvatski Dragovoljac players
Yanbian Funde F.C. players
Guizhou F.C. players
Beijing Sport University F.C. players
FC Ordabasy players
NK Sesvete players
Dalian Transcendence F.C. players
NK Krško players
S.S. Fidelis Andria 1928 players
Belgian Pro League players
Croatian Football League players
First Football League (Croatia) players
China League One players
Kazakhstan Premier League players
Slovenian PrvaLiga players
Serie D players
Bosnia and Herzegovina expatriate footballers
Expatriate footballers in Belgium
Bosnia and Herzegovina expatriate sportspeople in Belgium
Expatriate footballers in Croatia
Bosnia and Herzegovina expatriate sportspeople in Croatia
Expatriate footballers in China
Bosnia and Herzegovina expatriate sportspeople in China
Expatriate footballers in Kazakhstan
Bosnia and Herzegovina expatriate sportspeople in Kazakhstan
Expatriate footballers in Slovenia
Bosnia and Herzegovina expatriate sportspeople in Slovenia
Expatriate footballers in Italy
Bosnia and Herzegovina expatriate sportspeople in Italy